The president of the Republic of Indonesia is both the head of state and the head of government of the Republic of Indonesia. The president leads the executive branch of the Indonesian government and is the commander-in-chief of the Indonesian National Armed Forces. Since 2004, the president and vice president are directly elected to a five-year term, once renewable, allowing for a maximum of 10 years in office.

Joko Widodo is the seventh and current president of Indonesia. He assumed office on 20 October 2014.

History

Sukarno era 
The Indonesian presidency was established during the formulation of the 1945 Constitution by the Investigating Committee for Preparatory Work for Independence (BPUPK). The office was first filled on 18 August 1945 when Sukarno was elected by acclamation by the Preparatory Committee for Indonesian Independence (PPKI) because according to the Transitional Provisions of the Constitution, "the President and the Vice President for the first time shall be elected by the PPKI." Also, the body responsible for the presidential elections, the People's Consultative Assembly (MPR), had not yet been formed. On 16 October 1945, Vice President Mohammad Hatta announced a vice-presidential decree which gave the Central National Committee of Indonesia (KNIP) legislative powers. On 11 November 1945, the KNIP made the decision to separate the role of Head of State from that of Head of Government. Although a new constitution had not been set up yet, Indonesia was now a de facto parliamentary democracy with the president as a ceremonial Head of State whose function was to ask the prime minister as the Head of the Government to form a new Cabinet.

During the Indonesian National Revolution, both Sukarno and Hatta were captured by the Dutch in Yogyakarta on 18 December 1948. Sukarno then gave a mandate for Sjafruddin Prawiranegara to form an emergency government. This was done and the Emergency Government of the Republic of Indonesia (PDRI) was formed in Sumatra with Prawiranegara as its chairman. Prawiranegara handed back his mandate to Sukarno on 13 July 1949. On 17 December 1949, Sukarno was elected president of the Republic of the United States of Indonesia (RIS) and presidential mandate passed to Assaat. When it became clear that RIS was going to be replaced by a unitary state, Asaat stepped down from the presidency and Sukarno once again became president on 15 August 1950.

Indonesia now adopted the constitution that had been intended for RIS. Officially known as the Provisional Constitution, the document confirmed the president's role as the head of state, but limited him to a mostly ceremonial role. He appointed a prime minister on the advice of formateurs.

Despite his limited constitutional role, Sukarno commanded great moral authority.  Nonetheless, he was never content with the role of ceremonial head of State, and grew increasingly disenchanted with western-style parliamentary democracy. In the early 1950s, he began calling for the implementation of "Guided Democracy," in which decisions would be made after lengthy deliberation with a view toward achieving a consensus under presidential "guidance."

The rest of the decade saw a series of unstable governments.  Taking advantage of the situation, Sukarno made a speech in April 1959 and suggested that Indonesia return to the 1945 Constitution. The People reacted enthusiastically and there was strong pressure on the Constitutional Assembly, the body responsible for formulating a new constitution, to adopt the 1945 Constitution. When the assembly did not budge, Sukarno issued a presidential decree on 5 July 1959 declaring that Indonesia was returning to the 1945 Constitution.  That document made the president head of government as well as head of state.  In May 1963, the People's Consultative Assembly appointed Sukarno president for Life.

Although Indonesia had re-adopted the 1945 Constitution, it did not mean that it was strictly adhered to. The MPR, which at this stage was still on a provisional basis (MPRS), was subservient to the president despite its status of the Nation's highest Governing Body. It was only in 1966, when the political tide began to turn against Sukarno that the MPRS nominally regained its rightful constitutional status. In 1967, Sukarno was forced to resign as president, and army chief of staff Suharto was appointed as acting president.

Suharto era 
Suharto was appointed president in his own right in 1968. During his rise to power, Suharto seemed determined to observe at least the forms of the constitution, and this continued when he became president. Suharto allowed the MPR to execute its constitutional duty of formulating the Outlines of State Policy (GBHN); as president, he was responsible for implementing them. Suharto also made it a presidential obligation to deliver accountability speeches near the end of his terms. During the speech, Suharto outlined the achievements that his administration had made and how those achievements had adhered to the GBHN set by the MPR. Despite the constitutional and democratic façade, Suharto made sure that the MPR was also subservient to him. In 1969, a law was passed that required appointments to the MPR to be made official by the president. He also took measures that largely emasculated the opposition parties. For example, he had the power to issue governmental regulations in lieu of law, which nominally had to be approved by the House of People's Representatives (DPR, the pre-2004 legislative branch).  However, given the DPR's infrequent sessions and the near-total dominance of the pro-government political grouping, Golkar, such approval was a mere formality.  Thus, for all intents and purposes, Suharto ruled by decree for most of his tenure.  For the better part of Suharto's rule, he effectively held all governing power in the nation.

Reform era 
Suharto fell from power in May 1998 and the presidency experienced changes as a result of the reform movement. Compared to Suharto, who had all of his accountability speeches accepted, B. J. Habibie had his only accountability speech rejected. Abdurrahman Wahid then became the first president who had to beat another candidate to be elected, as Sukarno and Suharto had been sole candidates. As a result of this, Wahid was also the first president to be elected through counting votes instead of by acclamation. However, Wahid was impeached and removed from office by the MPR. This was a clear sign that while the presidency is the key institution, the MPR was now truly a check on the president's power. Wahid was replaced by his vice president, Megawati Sukarnoputri, daughter of Sukarno and former opposition leader during Suharto's presidency. Megawati is the first and, so far, only female ever to become President of Indonesia.

During the 2001 MPR Annual Session, it was finally decided that from 2004 onwards, the president will directly be elected by the people. In 2004 election, Susilo Bambang Yudhoyono became Indonesia's first directly elected president, beating incumbent Megawati Sukarnoputri in the runoff election. In 2014, Yudhoyono finished his second presidential term and was barred from seeking re-election.

The 3rd Indonesian presidential election was held on 9 July 2014 and matched former general and Suharto's ex-son in law Prabowo Subianto against the governor of Jakarta, Joko Widodo. On 22 July the General Elections Commission announced Joko Widodo's victory. He and his vice president, Jusuf Kalla, were sworn in on 20 October 2014, for a 5-year term.

Requirements to run for office
The Amended 1945 Constitution: The presidential candidate has to be an Indonesian citizen since their birth, who has not willingly become a citizen in another nation, has not betrayed the nation, and is physically and mentally capable of performing the duties. Amended Constitution also states that further criteria will be determined by laws. The president is also required to be nominated by a Political Party or a coalition of Political Parties.

2017 Law No. 7 Regarding Presidential and Vice-Presidential ElectionsThe presidential candidate must:
Mindful of God;
have been an Indonesian citizen since their birth, who has not willingly become a citizen of another nation;
spouse, if any, holds Indonesian citizenship;
have not betrayed the nation, and has not been involved in any corruption or other serious criminal offense;
be physically and mentally capable of performing the duties as well as free from any drug abuse;
be a permanent resident in the territory of the Republic of Indonesia;
have reported their wealth to the Corruption Eradication Commission;
have no debt individually or collectively that can create a loss for the state;
have not been declared bankrupt by a court decision;
never been involved in any despicable act;
not concurrently running as a candidate for member of the legislature;
be registered as a voter;
be registered as a tax payer and have paid taxes for at least the last five years;
have never previously served as president for two terms;
faithful to Pancasila, the 1945 Constitution, the Republic of Indonesia, and Bhinneka Tunggal Ika;
have never been sentenced to jail for five years or more;
not be less than 40 years of age;
have graduated at least from the senior high school or its equivalent;
not a former member of the Communist Party of Indonesia, including its mass organizations, or not directly involved in the 30 September Movement;
have a vision, mission, and program in running the government.
This law also stipulates that only political parties or a coalition of political parties that obtained 20% of the seats in the DPR or 25% of the total valid votes in the previous election may nominate president and vice president candidate.

The Original 1945 Constitution: The presidential candidate has to be of Indonesian origin.

The 1950 Provisional Constitution: The presidential candidate has to be an Indonesian citizen aged at least 30 years old. They cannot be someone who is deemed to be undesirable or has had their right to take part in elections revoked. They are also required to not be involved with any private corporations.

Election, term of office, constitutional requirements

The Amended 1945 Constitution: Together with the vice president, the president is elected directly by the people on a ticket. Further election rules are determined by laws passed by the DPR. The president-elect is required to read either an oath or a promise of office before officially becoming president. The term of office is five years and after that the president can be re-elected for only one more term. The president and vice president candidate must receive over half the votes total, including at least 20% of the votes in at least half the 38 provinces to win. In the event that no pairs of candidates for President and Vice President are elected, the two pairs of candidates who get the first and second most votes in the general election are elected directly by the people and the pair that receives the most votes is elected as President and Vice President.

The Original 1945 Constitution: Together with the vice president, the president is elected by the MPR with the largest number of votes. The president-elect is also required to read either an oath or a promise of office before officially becoming president. The term of office is five years and after that the president can be re-elected again.

The 1950 Provisional Constitution: Together with the vice president, the president is elected according to rules specified by laws. The president-elect is required to read either an oath or a promise or a statement of office before officially becoming president. The president is constitutionally required to live where the seat of Government is.

Oath/affirmation of office

Before entering his/her office, the President or Vice President must take an oath or affirmation in the session of the People's Consultative Assembly (MPR). If the MPR is unable to hold a session, the oath or promise is made in a session of the People's Representative Council (DPR). If the DPR is unable to hold a session, the oath or affirmation is made before the leadership of the MPR in the presence of the leadership of the Supreme Court.

Oath of Office of the President of the Republic of Indonesia: "I swear by God to fulfill the duties of President (Vice President) of the Republic of Indonesia to the best of my capabilities and in the fairest way possible, to uphold the Constitution by all means and to execute all laws and regulations as straightforwardly as possible as well as to dedicate myself to the service of the Nation and the People."

Pledge of Office of the President of the Republic of Indonesia: "I solemnly pledge to fulfill the duties of President (Vice President) of the Republic of Indonesia to the best of my capabilities and in the fairest way possible, to uphold the Constitution by all means and to execute all laws and regulations as straightforwardly as possible as well as to dedicate myself to the service of the Nation and the People."

Powers
The Amended 1945 Constitution: The president has constitutional authority over the government and has the power to name and remove ministers. The president has the right to propose bills to DPR, to discuss bills with the DPR to reach an agreement, make government regulations in accordance with laws, and in the case of emergencies has the power to make Government regulations in lieu of law. Militarily, the president holds supreme authority over the Indonesian National Armed Forces. Diplomatically, the president can only sign treaties, rehabilitate prisoners, and appoint Judicial Committee members with the DPR's agreement. The President can only appoint ambassadors and accept ambassadors from other countries by taking into account the DPR's considerations. The president has the power to grant pardons but must consider the advice of the Supreme Court. The president also has the final say over chief justice candidates.

The Original 1945 Constitution: The president has constitutional authority over the Government and has the power to name and remove ministers. The president has the power to create laws with the agreement of the People's Representative Council (DPR), to make Government regulations in accordance with laws, and in the case of emergencies has the power to make Government regulations in lieu of law. Militarily, the president holds supreme authority over the Army, Navy, and Air Force whilst security-wise, the president has the power to declare a State of Emergency. Diplomatically, the president, with the agreement of the DPR, has the power to declare war, peace, and to sign treaties. In addition, the president appoints ambassadors and consuls as well as accepting ambassadors from other countries. Finally, the president has power to give amnesties and pardons as well as awarding titles and honours.

The 1950 Provisional Constitution: The president has the power to name cabinets and appoint the prime minister with the advice of formateurs. The president is able to remove ministers from office and has the right to be informed of important matters by the Council of Ministers. As the head of state, the president has the power to dissolve the DPR and order for an election to be held within 30 days. Militarily, the president holds supreme authority over the Armed Forces although any decision on this matter needs to be countersigned by the appropriate ministers and wartime control of  troops has to be placed under an Armed Forces Commander. The president requires permission from the DPR to declare war and sign treaties although the president has independent power to appoint ambassadors and to accept them. The president also has the power to grant pardons.

Constitution

Assistance in performing duties
The Amended 1945 Constitution: The president is assisted by the vice president and their ministers. The ministers are appointed and dismissed by the president. Each minister is in charge of certain government affairs. The president is also allowed to form their own advisory teams which will further be regulated by laws passed by the DPR.

The Original 1945 Constitution: The president is assisted by the vice president and their ministers. The president is also able to seek advice from the Supreme Advisory Council (DPA).

The 1950 Provisional Constitution: The president is assisted by the vice president.

Line of succession and impeachment

The Amended 1945 Constitution: If the president dies, resigns, removed, or is unable to perform their duties for any reason, they are replaced by the vice president. If the vice president becomes vacant, the president nominates two candidates and the MPR has to elect a new vice president out of the candidates within 60 days. If the president and the vice president dies, resigns, or are unable to perform their duties for any reason, the government will be taken over together by the minister of home affairs, minister of foreign affairs, and minister of defense. No later than 30 days after that, MPR must elect a new president and vice president from the two candidates nominated by the political party or coalition of political parties whose candidates were the winner and the runner-up in the previous presidential election.

Under the amended constitution, the president (also vice president) can now be impeached and removed from office. If the president is viewed to have violated the law in the form of treason against the state, corruption, bribery, other serious crimes, or disgraceful acts, and/or no longer meets the requirements to be president, the DPR can ask the Constitutional Court to look into the matter, during which it has 90 days to make a decision. The DPR's request to the Constitutional Court can only be made with the support of 2/3 of the total number of DPR members who are present at the session which is attended by at least 2/3 of the DPR's members (At least 44.44% of the total members of the DPR). If the Constitutional Court decides that the president has violated the law, the DPR can motion for the MPR to convene. The president would then be given one last chance to defend himself before the MPR makes the decision whether or not the president should be impeached. The decision of the MPR to dismiss the President and/or the Vice President is made with the approval of at least 2/3 of the members of the MPR who are present at the session which is attended by at least 3/4 of all members of the MPR (at least 50% of the total members of the MPR).

The Original 1945 Constitution: If the president dies, resigns, or is unable to perform their duties for any reason, they are replaced by the vice president.

The 1950 Provisional Constitution: If the president dies, resigns, or is unable to perform their duties for any reason, they are replaced by the vice president.

Although there is no article about president (and vice president) impeachment in the original 1945 Constitution, Sukarno and Abdurrahman Wahid were still impeached in 1967 and 2001. Article on the impeachment of the president and vice president were made after the impeachment of Abdurrahman Wahid in the 3rd amendment to the Constitution.

Post-presidency and decorations

Post-presidency rights
Law No.7 of 1978 stipulates that former presidents are entitled to a pension. Former presidents are also entitled to a house, with electricity, water, and telephone bills covered by the government. In addition to that, former presidents shall have free healthcare for their families and a car with a chauffeur.

Decorations 

The presidents of Indonesia, as the issuer of decorations and the Grandmaster of Star Decorations are automatically awarded the highest class of all civilian and military Star Decorations. Currently there are 14 decorations which will be bestowed upon them soon after taking office, namely:

List of presidents

Timeline

During the Indonesian National Revolution

Sukarno (18 August 1945 – 18 December 1948)
Sjafruddin Prawiranegara (19 December 1948 – 13 July 1949) – Head of the Emergency Government of the Republic of Indonesia.
Sukarno (14 July 1949 – 17 December 1949)
Assaat (17 December 1949 – 15 August 1950) – during the United States of Indonesia, Sukarno became the president of the United States of Indonesia. The Republic was merely a component of the union.
Sukarno (from 15 August 1950) – upon (re)-establishment of the unitary Republic of Indonesia.

Latest election 
The most recent presidential election was held in 2019 where the incumbent president Joko Widodo and his running mate Ma'ruf Amin defeated Prabowo Subianto and his running mate Sandiaga Uno with 55.5% of the vote.

See also
 Vice President of Indonesia
 Presidential state car
 Air Indonesia One
 Paspampres
 List of presidents of Indonesia

Notes

References

1945 establishments in Indonesia
Government of Indonesia